James Stirling (born 1852 in Geelong – died 1909) was an Australian botanist and geologist.

References

1852 births
1909 deaths
19th-century Australian botanists
19th-century Australian geologists
20th-century Australian botanists
20th-century Australian geologists